Carl-Erik Särndal (born 1937) is a Swedish-Canadian statistician. specializing in survey statistics. He held professorial appointments at Umeå University; University of British Columbia, Université de Montréal, and Statistics Sweden, Stockholm. He specialized in survey theory and methodology, especially with applications to official statistics production for a country. He worked, periodically, as researcher, expert and/or consultant, at national statistical agencies: Statistics Canada (Ottawa), Statistics Sweden (Stockholm) and Statistics Finland (Helsinki).

Education and professional years 
Carl-Erik Särndal grew up in Sweden. He attended Lund University, where he earned a Bachelor of Science degree (1957), a PhD degree in statistics (1962). He was a professor at the Department of Statistics, Umeå University, Sweden, 1967-1970; Division of Management Science, Faculty of Commerce & Business Administration,
University of British Columbia, Vancouver, 1970-1980; Département de mathématiques et de statistique, Université de Montréal, 1980-1997; Statistics Sweden, 1997-2002.

Research 
Model assisted design-based inference; uses of auxiliary information in estimation; generalized regression (GREG) estimation; calibration weighting, in particular for survey nonresponse; critical examination of the probability sampling paradigm.

Honours and awards 
Fellow, American Statistical Association, 1973.
Honorary member, Finnish Statistical Society, 1995.
Honorary doctor’s degree (filosofie hedersdoktor), Örebro University, Sweden, 2000.
Honorary Member, Statistical Society of Canada, 2002.
Waksberg Award, by American Statistical Association and Statistics Canada, to prominent survey methodology statistician, 2007.
Jerzy Neyman Medal, Polish Statistical Association, 2018.
Honorary doctor's degree, Université de Neuchâtel, Switzerland, 2022.

Select bibliography

Books 
C.M. Cassel, C.E. Särndal, J. Wretman (1977), Foundations of Inference in Survey Sampling. New York: Wiley, 192 pp.
C.E. Särndal, B. Swensson, J. Wretman (1992), Model Assisted Survey Sampling. New York: Springer-Verlag, 695 pp, in paperback 2003.
C.E. Särndal, S. Lundström (2005), Estimation in Surveys with Nonresponse. New York: Wiley, 212 pp.

Selected articles 
C.M. Cassel, C.E. Särndal and J.H. Wretman (1976), Some results on generalized difference estimation and generalized regression estimation for finite populations. Biometrika, 63, 615- 620.
J.C. Deville, C.E. Särndal (1992), Calibration estimators in survey sampling. Journal of the American Statistical Association, 87, 376-382.
C.E. Särndal (2007). The calibration approach in survey theory and practice. Survey Methodology Journal, 33(2), 99-119.

Further reading 
R. Platek and C.E. Särndal (2001). Can a statistician deliver? Journal of Official Statistics, 17(1), 1-127, with discussions and rejoinder.
P.S. Kott (2005). An interview with the authors of Model Assisted Survey Sampling. Journal of Official Statistics, 21(2), 171-182.
D. Devaud and Y. Tillé (2019). Deville and Särndal’s calibration: revisiting a 25-year-old successful optimization problem, TEST, 28(4), 1033-1091, with discussions and rejoinder.

References

External links 

Living people
1937 births
Swedish statisticians
Canadian statisticians
Swedish emigrants to Canada
Academic staff of Umeå University
Academic staff of the University of British Columbia
Academic staff of the Université de Montréal
Lund University alumni